Museum of Oriental Art may refer to:

 State Museum of Oriental Art, a museum in Moscow
 Museum of Oriental Art (Turin), a museum in Turin
 National Museum of Oriental Art, a museum in Rome
 Museum of Oriental Art "Bratko", a museum in Korçë
 Museum of Western and Oriental Art, a museum in Kiev
 Durham University Oriental Museum, a museum in Durham
 Edoardo Chiossone Museum of Oriental Art, a museum in Genoa